Paul Emerick (born January 24, 1980) is the head coach of the American Raptors in Glendale, Colorado. He was the defense and skills coach and the 2019 interim head coach for the Houston SaberCats of Major League Rugby. He was a former USA international rugby player. He played centre, fullback or wing for the USA Eagles and last played professionally for London Wasps.

Club
Emerick was born in Emmetsburg, Iowa, and played his university rugby with the University of Northern Iowa Panthers. He then moved into senior rugby with the Chicago Lions. He moved to Italian rugby in the 2004–05 season joining Amatori Catania and then to Overmach Parma the following season. In the summer of 2006 Emerick completed a move to Celtic League side Newport Gwent Dragons, the side he helped knock out of the Heineken Cup in a playoff a few months earlier with Overmach Parma. In 2008 Emerick re-joined Italian club Overmach Parma from Welsh regional side Newport Gwent Dragons. Overmach Parma had gone through a re-organisation that saw the club merge with Noceto in August 2010 to form Crusaders Rugby Parma.  In September 2010 he joined Ulster Rugby on a 3-month contract. He signed a deal with London Wasps in February 2012. On August 7, 2013 Emerick announced his retirement from professional rugby.

International

Emerick was first capped by the USA Eagles in April 2003 against Spain and as of September 2011 Emerick has been capped 54 times becoming the first back in Eagles history to have more than 50 caps. As of June 19, 2012, Emerick had notched 15 career tries for the United States, ranking him second on the all-time list and first among active players.

Emerick received a yellow card in the closing minutes of the Eagles' 2007 Rugby World Cup match against England for a tip tackle on England's Olly Barkley. Emerick was subsequently suspended for five weeks, ruling him out of the remaining Rugby World Cup campaign. He was suspended for ten weeks in 2009 for kicking Canadian center D. T. H. van der Merwe in the head during a qualifying match for the 2011 Rugby World Cup.

Coaching career
Paul Emerick is the skills and defense coach for the Houston SaberCats of Major League Rugby on September 20, 2018.

International tries

References

External links
 
Newport profile
USA rugby
scrum.com
USA profile
Rugby World Cup 2007 profile
Overmach Parma profile

Houston SaberCats coaches
Male rugby sevens players
Dragons RFC players
1980 births
Living people
American rugby union coaches
American rugby union players
People from Emmetsburg, Iowa
United States international rugby union players
United States international rugby sevens players
Ulster Rugby players
Wasps RFC players